Kleinwort may refer to:

Kleinwort Baronets
Kleinwort Benson
Kleinwort Hambros